The Landwind CV7 or Landwind Forward is a subcompact sedan produced by Chinese auto maker Landwind.

Overview

The Landwind CV7 originally debuted in October 2007. The design was conducted by Changan Automobile's European design studio, while technical suppliers include EDAG and Forschungsgesellschaft für Energietechnik und Verbrennungsmotoren. The vehicle was criticized for resembling the fourth generation Ford Fiesta sedan as Changan Automobile took advantage of the joint venture with Ford while developing the model.

The Landwind CV7 is powered by a 1.3 liter inline-4 engine or a 1.5 liter inline-4 SOHC JL475Q8 engine producing 95PS (70kW) and 137Nm with a 5-speed manual transmission as the only gearbox option.

Landwind CV7 Sport
The Landwind CV7 Sport is a sportier variant of the CV7 sedan. The CV7 Sport was revealed during the 2008 Beijing Auto Show featuring a body kit. The engine is the 1.5 liter inline-4 engine producing a maximum torque of 137N·m at 3500rpm to 4500rpm and 70kW at 5500rpm

References

External links 

 – JMC Official website

Cars introduced in 2007
2000s cars
Cars of China
Front-wheel-drive vehicles
Subcompact cars
Sedans